Middle Ground Rock is a submerged kelp-covered rock lying  east of Framnaes Point, in the middle of the entrance of Stromness Bay, South Georgia in the South Atlantic Ocean. The name appears to be first used on a 1952 British Admiralty chart.

References

Rock formations of South Georgia